Protonitazene is a benzimidazole derivative with potent opioid effects which has been sold over the internet as a designer drug since around 2021, and has been identified in various European countries, as well as Canada, the USA and Australia. It has been linked to numerous cases of drug overdose, and is a Schedule I drug in the USA.

See also 
 Etonitazene
 Isotonitazene
 Metonitazene

References 

Analgesics
Designer drugs
Benzimidazole opioids
Nitro compounds